August Heinrich Lehmann (May 29, 1842- ?) was an American restaurateur from Hustisford, Wisconsin who served a single one-year term as a member of the Wisconsin State Assembly from Dodge County.

Background 
Lehmann was born in the village of Alt-Küstrinchen in the Kingdom of Prussia on May 29, 1842. He received a common school education. He came to Wisconsin in 1858, and eventually settled in Hustisford, where he became a restaurateur. In 1864 he married Auguste Schwensow (1844-1920) of Hustisford, a native of Brandenburg.

Legislative service 
In 1873 he was elected as Assemblyman for Dodge County's 5th district (the Towns of Herman, Hubbard, Hustisford and Rubicon) as a member of the new Liberal Reform Party, with 495 votes, to 462 for Independent Beder Wood and 219 for Republican C. A. Melcher (Democratic incumbent Satterlee Clark, Jr. was not a candidate). He was assigned to the joint committee on local legislation.

He was not a candidate for re-election in 1874, and was succeeded by Democrat William M. Morse. (There was no Reform candidate in the race.)

Personal life 
When Auguste died in 1920 of dropsy, Lehmann was still alive. The couple at that time had five children, 19 grandchildren and three great-grandchildren

References 

1842 births
American restaurateurs
Businesspeople from Wisconsin
Members of the Wisconsin State Assembly
People from Hustisford, Wisconsin
Wisconsin Reformers (19th century)
19th-century American politicians
Prussian emigrants to the United States
Year of death missing